The Continuum of Humanist Education is a project run by the Institute for Humanist Studies. It has a faculty, staff, and bookstore. It offers courses in education about the history and practise of Humanism. The introductory course is offered freely.

They adopt a commonly used motto in learning: Sapere aude.

External links
Continuum of Humanist Education main page

Humanism
United States educational programs